"19-2000", sometimes written "19/2000", is a song from the British virtual band Gorillaz' self-titled debut album Gorillaz. It was the second single from the album, released on 25 June 2001 in the United Kingdom. "19-2000" reached number six on the UK Singles Chart and number 34 on the US Billboard Mainstream Top 40 chart. It was particularly successful in New Zealand, where it reached number one for a week in September 2001.

Background
"19-2000" released was accompanied by a completely new version of the song, called the "Soulchild Remix", which was produced by music producers Damien Mendis and Stuart Bradbury. Mendis was asked to remix a track off the album in the hope that it would give it crossover potential, in the same way as the Ed Case remix of "Clint Eastwood" had. Mendis was given a copy of all their demos and finished tracks for the album, being told to "pick [a song] that you can produce, remix or whatever into a hit single". Mendis was unsure which track to choose, and only when he was told that Jamie Hewlett was already working on the video for "19-2000", did he make his decision. Tina Weymouth and Miho Hatori contributed backing vocals to "19–2000", whilst Damon Albarn performed the vocals on the verses.

Music video
The video, directed by Jamie Hewlett and Pete Candeland, is animated, both in 2D and 3D. It features Gorillaz riding in their Geep (as mentioned in the 2005 MTV Cribs episode, featuring the Gorillaz) along a twisted highway, encountering roller coaster style loops, a killer UFO, and – when Murdoc decides not to take an exit leading toward a church – a giant moose. Murdoc tries to blow up the moose with a pair of missiles, but the moose sneezes right before impact, sending them back to the car, which explodes and skids along the highway on fire. The members of Gorillaz appear to have black ash all over them from the blast. In between these various encounters the Gorillaz pass and perform things in time with the rhythm—such as a field of nodding donkeys, or the light posts passing them at the beginning, and a couple of sections where the buggy does several versions of the wheelie (including side wheelies, otherwise known as Skiing) and even appears to break the sound barrier. There are two versions of this video, one to fit the original mix and one to fit the Soulchild remix. The videos are almost identical, except for a few minor changes in order for the two songs to sync up with the video. On the motorway, there are signs to Amity, a reference to Jaws, the Overlook Hotel, a reference to The Shining, and Camp Crystal, a reference to Friday the 13th. It was shown in the MTV Cribs tour of Kong Studios that the buggy actually survived the blast, and now sits in the Kong Studio's parking lot.

Remix 
A remix titled "Gorillaz On My Mind" was recorded for the Blade II soundtrack. The remix featured multiple verses from American Rapper Redman.

Track listings

UK enhanced CD single
 "19-2000" – 3:30
 "19–2000" (Soulchild Remix) – 3:29
 "Left Hand Suzuki Method" – 3:12
 "19–2000" (The Making of the Video: "Realising the Dream") – 4:48

UK and European 12-inch single
A1. "19–2000" – 3:30
A2. "Left Hand Suzuki Method" – 3:12
B1. "19-2000" (The Wiseguys House of Wisdom Remix) – 7:15

UK cassette single
 "19-2000" – 3:30
 "19–2000" (Soulchild Remix) – 3:29
 "Hip Albatross" – 2:42

US promo CD
 "19-2000" (Soulchild Remix) – 3:29
 "19–2000" – 3:30
 "19–2000" (Call-Out Hook) – 0:14

US promo 12-inch vinyl
A1. "19–2000" (Soulchild Remix) – 3:29
A2. "19–2000" – 3:30
B1. "19-2000" (The Wiseguys House of Wisdom Remix) – 7:15

Personnel
Credits are lifted from the UK enhanced CD single liner notes.
 Damon Albarn – vocals, synthesizers, guitar
 Miho Hatori – vocals
 Tina Weymouth – additional vocals, additional percussion
 Dan the Automator – sampled loops, additional synthesizers
 Chris Frantz – additional percussion
 Tom Girling – Pro Tools, engineering
 Jason Cox – engineering
 Howie Weinberg – mastering

Charts

Weekly charts

Year-end charts

Certifications

Release history

References

2001 singles
2001 songs
EMI Records singles
Gorillaz songs
British funk songs
Dub songs
Number-one singles in New Zealand
Parlophone singles
Songs written by Damon Albarn
Songs written by Jamie Hewlett
Virgin Records singles